Abdullah Hussein or Hussain may refer to:

Abdullah II of Jordan (born 1962), King of Jordan
Abdullah Hussain (1920–2014), Malaysian novelist and writer
Abdullah Hussain (writer) (1931–2015), Pakistani novelist